Sarah Catherine Elnicky (born October 5, 1982) is an American soccer defender who plays for Kvarnsvedens IK.

References 

 

1982 births
Living people
American women's soccer players
IK Sirius Fotboll players
Medkila IL (women) players
Damallsvenskan players
American expatriate sportspeople in Sweden
Expatriate women's footballers in Sweden
American expatriate sportspeople in Norway
Expatriate women's footballers in Norway
Women's association football defenders
Syracuse Orange women's soccer players
Kvarnsvedens IK players